East Carmel is an unincorporated community in Columbiana County, in the U.S. state of Ohio.

History
Waterford was the name of a town site platted in 1806 near present-day East Carmel, but no lots were sold and the project was considered a failure. A post office called East Carmel was established in 1870, and remained in operation until 1904.

References

Unincorporated communities in Columbiana County, Ohio
1806 establishments in Ohio
Unincorporated communities in Ohio